Wipim Airstrip is an airstrip in Wipim, South Fly in the Western Province of Papua New Guinea . It currently has two airplanes flying in and out of Wipim Airstrip, which are flown by Mission Aviation Fellowship or MAF and other flights by Airlines PNG with up to three domestic flights per week to various Western Province towns. The runway is 1640 ft. long and elevated 100 ft. Its world area code is 804.

Notes and references

Airports in Papua New Guinea